The 33rd Artistic Gymnastics World Championships were held in Lausanne, Switzerland, in 1997.

The 1997 Worlds were notable because they were the first major contest to be held after the elimination of compulsory exercises. For this competition, tie-breaker policies were used. When scores were identical, the gymnast with the higher score in the preliminary round was awarded the higher placement in finals.

Medalists

Medal table

Overall

Men

Women

Men

Team

All-around

Floor exercise

Pommel horse

Rings

Vault

Parallel bars

Horizontal bar

Women

Team

All-around

Vault

Uneven bars

Balance beam

Floor exercise

References 

World Artistic Gymnastics Championships
G
W
International gymnastics competitions hosted by Switzerland